Circassian cuisine is an ethnic cuisine, based on the cooking style and traditions of the Circassian people of the North Caucasus. This region lies between the Black Sea and the Caspian Sea, within European Russia.

Traditional dishes

Circassian cuisine consists of many different traditional dishes, varying by season. The summer time traditional dishes are mainly dairy products and vegetables. In winter and spring, the traditional dishes mostly consist of flour and meat. Traditional dishes include ficcin, seasoned chicken or turkey with sauce, boiled mutton and beef with a seasoning of sour milk along with salt and crushed garlic.

Among  the many varieties of cheese in the North Caucasus, Circassian cheese is the  most popular one.

On holidays, the Adyghe people traditionally make Haliva from toasted millet or wheat flour.

Fresh meat dishes
Circassian goulash
Meat goulash
Lamb boiled in cream
Liver in fat
Liver sausage
Liver with sheep's-tail fat
Thick pancake with liver and eggs
Sheep sausage
Fried sheep's tail fat with honey
Sheep's tail fat cracklings
Sheep's tail fat with honey
Shepherd's lamb
Boiled mutton
Thin mutton sausage

Dried and smoked meat dishes

Fried meat
Fried meat and potatoes
Fried meat with onions
Meat and beans broth
Meat and noodles
Meat and potato broth
Meat roasted on skewers, shashlik
Dried sheep's side
Smoked meat goulash

Poultry and egg dishes
Boiled chicken with garlic
Broasted chicken
Chicken fried in a brazier
Chicken with new potatoes
Chicken and noodles
Chicken in pepper sauce
Chicken in soured cream sauce, 
Chicken in walnut sauce
Fried chicken with onion
Stuffed chicken baked in dough
Eggs fried in soured cream
Boiled goose or duck
Goose (duck) with noodles
Baked goose (duck) stuffed with Rice

Sweet omelette
Pastry straws, twiglets
Boiled turkey
Stuffed turkey

Fish dishes (Bdzezchey shxinighwexer)
Fried fish
Fried fish in soured cream

Dairy product dishes
 
 Baked milk (She sch'eghepschtha)
 Cheese
 Fried cheese
 Hominy or polenta
 Kurt
  – This kind of milk preserve is not used in contemporary times. It used to be prepared for winter.
 Sour milk
 Soured cream sauce with cheese

Flour, cereal and navy-bean dishes
Lakum
Haliva stuffed with offal, cottage cheese, potatoes, potatoes and cheese, navy beans or pears
Potato and cheese pie
Cottage-cheese and cottage cheese and scallion pie

Flaky bread
Shalama

Cornbread, unleavened ( or ) or leavened
Maize lakum
Unleavened millet bread ( or )

Boiled or roasted corn on the cob
Corn flakes
Maize or millet halama
Kilish
Wheat or maize pasta

Millet soup
Boiled barley
 or )

Sweet rice pilaf
Dumplings with meat or chicken
Navy-bean sauce, soup or soup with potatoes

Potato and gourd dishes
Baked gourd
Boiled gourd
Gourd sauce
Potato paste
Fried potatoes
New potatoes stewed in soured cream
Potato stewed in soured cream or broth

Beverages
Kalmyk tea
Makhsima
Maramazey

Sweets and desserts

Haliwa – sweet, dessert in Arabic

Nuts with honey
Dried pears
Watermelon honey

See also

References

 
Circassians